Ryan Bouallak (born 19 August 1999) is a French professional footballer who plays as a goalkeeper.

Club career
Bouallek started his youth career with Olympique Noisy-le-Sec before moving to JA Drancy and Saint-Étienne. In September 2016, he played a match for Saint-Étienne's reserve side in the French fifth division. He joined Reims in January 2018.

Bouallak moved to Troyes in July 2019, where he signed a three-year contract. He made his professional debut for the club on 15 May 2021 in a 2–3 league defeat against Le Havre. He started the match on bench and came on as an 80th minute substitute for Sébastien Renot.

International career
Bouallak have received call-up to France national under-18 team in the past, but didn't play any game. He is also eligible to play for Algeria.

Career statistics

Club

Honours
Troyes
Ligue 2: 2020–21

References

External links
 

1999 births
Living people
Association football goalkeepers
French footballers
French sportspeople of Algerian descent
Ligue 2 players
Championnat National 2 players
Championnat National 3 players
ES Troyes AC players